The 1949 Cleveland Indians season was the 49th in franchise history. The club entered the season as the defending World Champions. On March 5, 1949, Indians minority owner Bob Hope donned a Cleveland Indians uniform and posed with manager Lou Boudreau and vice president Hank Greenberg as the World Series champions opened spring training camp in Tucson, Arizona.

Offseason 
 November 15, 1948: 1948 minor league draft
Bob Chakales was drafted by the Indians from the Philadelphia Phillies.
Grant Dunlap was drafted from the Indians by the New York Yankees.
 December 14, 1948: Ed Klieman, Joe Haynes, and Eddie Robinson were traded by the Indians to the Washington Senators for Mickey Vernon and Early Wynn.
 Prior to 1949 season: Brooks Lawrence was signed as an amateur free agent by the Indians.

Regular season 
Following their 1948 World Series championship, the 1949 Indians season proved to be a disappointment. Despite having the best overall pitching and fielding statistics in either the American or National Leagues, the Indians finished a distant third place behind the New York Yankees and Boston Red Sox. A team roster that boasted eight future members of the Baseball Hall of Fame (Lou Boudreau, Larry Doby, Bob Feller, Joe Gordon, Bob Lemon, Satchel Paige, Minnie Miñoso, and Early Wynn) could not deliver a second consecutive championship to Cleveland. During the season, Indians fan Charlie Lupica spent 117 days on a flagpole, waiting for the Indians to regain first place. They never did, and he gave up his pursuit when the Indians were mathematically eliminated on September 25.

Season standings

Record vs. opponents

Notable transactions 
 April 28, 1949: Grant Dunlap was returned to the Indians by the New York Yankees.

Opening Day Lineup

Roster

Player stats

Batting

Starters by position 
Note: Pos = Position; G = Games played; AB = At bats; H = Hits; Avg. = Batting average; HR = Home runs; RBI = Runs batted in

Other batters 
Note: G = Games played; AB = At bats; H = Hits; Avg. = Batting average; HR = Home runs; RBI = Runs batted in

Pitching

Starting pitchers 
Note: G = Games pitched; IP = Innings pitched; W = Wins; L = Losses; ERA = Earned run average; SO = Strikeouts

Other pitchers 
Note: G = Games pitched; IP = Innings pitched; W = Wins; L = Losses; ERA = Earned run average; SO = Strikeouts

Relief pitchers 
Note: G = Games pitched; W = Wins; L = Losses; SV = Saves; ERA = Earned run average; SO = Strikeouts

Awards and honors 
Dale Mitchell, American League leader, triples (23)
Team ERA of 3.36 lowest in MLB for 1949
Team fielding percentage of .983 highest in MLB for 1949
All Star Game

Larry Doby, Outfielder, reserve

Joe Gordon, Second baseman, reserve

Jim Hegan, Catcher, reserve

Bob Lemon, Pitcher, reserve

Dale Mitchell, Outfielder, reserve

Farm system 

LEAGUE CHAMPIONS: Stroudsburg

Notes

References 
1949 Cleveland Indians at Baseball Reference
1949 Cleveland Indians  at Baseball Almanac

Cleveland Indians seasons
Cleveland Indians season
Cleveland Indians